Culasi, officially the Municipality of Culasi, is a 3rd class municipality in the province of Antique, Philippines. According to the 2020 census, it has a population of 44,494 people. Making it fourth most populous municipality in the province of Antique and third largest municipality in terms of land area, with a total area of 228.56 square kilometers.

The municipality of Culasi is known as the home of majestic Mount Madja-as, the highest peak in Panay. Madja-as an enchanted mountain sacred to ancient Visayans as it is home to the god of death, Sidapa, and god of meteors, Bulalakaw.

Etymology 
The name Culasi or Kulasi was derived from the local term for a species of mangrove Lumnitzera racemosa which grow abundantly in the vicinity's river basin.

History

Spanish colonial times 
During the Spanish colonial times, Culasi was known by its old name "Bacong". Now, Bacong is only one of its barangays. Bacong was one of the four visitas or towns established by the Spaniards. The others were Nalupa (now Barbaza), Bugason (now Bugasong), and Hamtik (now Hamtic).

The 1905 census revealed that Culasi had the biggest Chinese population in Antique, so much so that it had a barrio named "Villa de Hong Kong" in their honor. It is now part of the Poblacion.

1981 Bacong Bridge Massacre 
One of the significant events of the Philippines's Martial Law era was the Bacong Bridge Massacre, which took place in Culasi on December 19, 1981.  Sometimes also known as the Culasi incident, it involved the Philippine Constabulary killing 5 protester-farmers at the Bacong River bridge in Barangay Malacañang, Culasi, Antique. The victims were identified as Leopoldo A. Anos, Aquilino M. Castillo, Fortunato M. Dalisay, Remegildo P. Dalisay, and Joel B. Plaquino.

Geography

According to the Philippine Statistics Authority, the municipality has a land area of  constituting  of the  total area of Antique.

Located in the northern portion of the province, it is bounded on the north by Sebaste, south by Tibiao, west by the Sulu Sea and east by Mount Madja-as and the Municipality of Madalag, Aklan, just beyond. Its territory includes Maniguin (or Maningning / Hammerhead) and Batbatan Islands.

Excluding the outlying islands, its northernmost point is located at 11°32’05" latitude and 122°05’00" longitude. Its easternmost point is located at 11°30’50" latitude and 122°10’05" longitude. Its southernmost point is located at 11°21’04" latitude and 122°02’08" longitude and the westernmost point is at 11°31’05" latitude and 122°03’08" longitude.

List of islands in Culasi by land area 
 Batbatan Island  
 Maniguin Island  
 Mararison Island .

Topography
Culasi has a slope of 8°. It has unbroken mountain range from barangay Batonan Sur in the south to barangay Salde in the northernmost. From the peak of Madia-as Mountain it gradually flattens down to a narrow strip of the coastal plain. Land area roughly covers 82.92% upland and above lowland comprises 17.08% of the land area with a slope of 18% and below. Forest areas comprise almost half of the total land area covering .

Climate

Culasi has two distinct seasons, the rainy and dry. Rainy season occurs in the months of May to November and dry season for the rest of the year. Areas like the mountainous barangays of Flores and Osorio located at the southern portion of the municipality are characterized by a relatively cool temperature which is highly suited for coffee. The higher precipitation acquired may be caused by high mountain range or because of its high topography.

Barangays
Culasi is politically subdivided into 44 barangays,  which are classified into 3 island, 11 upland, 16 coastal and 14 interior/lowland barangays.

Demographics

In the 2020 census, Culasi had a population of 44,494.

Economy 

Farming and fishing are the major livelihood where the Culasinhon depend their living.

Natural resources
The rolling hills of Mount Madja-as are rich in manganese, copper and coal found in Timbaban. Other metallic mineral deposits are white clay and pebbles in the island barangays of Malalison and Batbatan. Sand and gravel is being extracted in various rivers and used for infrastructure. Another metallic mineral is the limestone deposit found in Sitio Bula, Camancijan and is used for agricultural and industrial purpose. Limestone is used in the production of cement.

Most treasured one is the oil deposit in Maniguin Island explored by the Philippine National Oil Corporation (PNOC). Several companies drilled oil deposit in Maniguin with black coal.

Communication
 Landline: Panay Telephone Corp. (PANTELCO)
 Cellular: Smart, Globe, Sun Cellular
 Postal Services: PhilPost
 Cable Television: Kalibo Cable TV-Culasi (Culasi CATV)
 Radio Station: Radyo Natin 101.1 (DYRE-FM) - MBC/Madjaas Communication Service, Sweet FM 95.9 - Xanthone Broadcasting
 Television: over-the-air TV signals picked up in the area are from Iloilo TV stations especially ABS-CBN TV 10 Iloilo which has a stronger signal.

Education

College
 Vicente A. Javier Memorial Community College (VAJMCC)

Secondary

 Bitadton National High School (BNHS)
 Lipata - Lamputong Integrated School (LLIS)
 Northern Antique Vocational School (NAVS)
 Saint Michael High School of Culasi, Inc. (SMHS)
 San Antonio National High School (SANHS)

Elementary

 Alojipan Primary School
 Bagacay Elementary School
 Balac-Balac Primary School
 Batbatan Elementary School
 Batonan Norte Elementary School
 Batonan Sur Primary School
 Bitadton Elementary School
 Buenavista Elementary School
 Buhi Elementary School
 Camancijan Elementary School
 Carit-an Elementary School
 Culasi Central School
 Culasi North Elementary School
 Esperanza Elementary School
 Fe-Caridad Elementary School
 Flores Elementary School
 Kawit Elementary School
 Light Bearer's Fundamental Baptist Learning Center, Inc.
 Mag-ayad Primary School
 Magsaysay Elementary School
 Malacañang Elementary School
 Malalison Elementary School
 Maniguin Elementary School
 Naba Primary School
 Osorio Elementary School
 Paningayan Primary School
 Saint Michael the Archangel Grade School of Culasi, Inc. (SMAGS)
 San Antonio Elementary School
 San Juan Elementary School
 San Luis-Condes Elementary School
 San Pascual Primary School
 San Vicente Elementary School
 Tomao Primary School
 Valderrama Elementary School

Pre-school
 Culasi Christian Learning Center (CCLC)
 Culasi Cooperative Learning Center (CMPC-LC)
 Day Care Centers (DCCs)
 Saint Michael Parochial Kindergarten School (SMPKS)
 Seaside Baptist Learning Center, Inc. (SBLCI)

References

External links

 [ Philippine Standard Geographic Code]

Municipalities of Antique (province)